The Soviet Union's K project nuclear test series was a group of five nuclear tests conducted in 1961–1962. These tests followed the 1961 Soviet nuclear tests series and preceded the 1962 Soviet nuclear tests series.

The K project nuclear testing series were all high altitude tests fired by missiles from the Kapustin Yar launch site in Russia across central Kazakhstan toward the Sary Shagan test range (see map below).

Two of the tests were 1.2 kiloton warheads tested in 1961.  The remaining three tests were of 300 kiloton warheads in 1962.

Electromagnetic pulse 

The worst effects of a Soviet high altitude test were from the electromagnetic pulse of the nuclear test on 22 October 1962 (during the Cuban Missile Crisis).

The Soviet scientists instrumented a  section of telephone line in the area that they expected to be affected by the nuclear detonation in order to measure the electromagnetic pulse effects. The electromagnetic pulse (EMP) fused all of the 570-kilometer monitored overhead telephone line with measured currents of 1500 to 3400 amperes during the 22 October 1962 test. Each sub-line was protected by fuses and by gas-filled overvoltage protectors. The EMP from the 22 October (K-3) nuclear test caused all of the fuses to blow and all of the overvoltage protectors to fire in all of the sub-lines of the  telephone line. The EMP from the same test caused the destruction of the Karaganda power plant, and shut down  of shallow-buried power cables between Astana (then called Aqmola) and Almaty.

The Partial Test Ban Treaty was passed the following year, ending atmospheric and exoatmospheric nuclear tests.

Aftereffects

Although the weapons used in the K Project were much smaller (up to 300 kilotons) than the United States Starfish Prime test of 1962, the damage caused by the resulting EMP was much greater because the K Project tests were done over a large populated land mass, and at a location where the Earth's magnetic field was greater. After the collapse of the Soviet Union, the level of this damage was communicated informally to scientists in the United States.

After the 1991 Soviet Union collapse, there was a period of a few years of cooperation between United States and Russian scientists on the high-altitude nuclear EMP phenomenon.  In addition, funding was secured to enable Russian scientists to formally report on some of the Soviet EMP results in international scientific journals.  As a result, formal scientific documentation of some of the EMP damage in Kazakhstan exists but is still sparse in the open scientific literature.

The 1998 IEEE article, however, does contain a number of details about the measurements of EMP effects on the instrumented  telephone line, including details about the fuses that were used and also about the gas-filled overvoltage protectors that were used on that communications line.  According to that paper, the gas-filled overvoltage protectors fired as a result of the voltages induced by the fast E1 component of the EMP, and the fuses were blown as the result of the slow E3 component of the EMP, which caused geomagnetically induced currents in all of the sub-lines.

The Aqmola (now Astana) to Almaty buried power cable was also shut down by the slow E3 component of the EMP.

Published reports, including the 1998 IEEE article, have stated that there were significant problems with ceramic insulators on overhead electrical power lines during the tests of the K Project. In 2010, a technical report written for a United States government laboratory, Oak Ridge National Laboratory, stated, "Power line insulators were damaged, resulting in a short circuit on the line and some lines detaching from the poles and falling to the ground."

References

1961A
1961 in the Soviet Union
1962 in the Soviet Union
1961 in military history
1962 in military history
Explosions in 1961
Explosions in 1962
October 1961 events
October 1962 events
November 1962 events in Asia
Energy weapons
Exoatmospheric nuclear weapons testing